Pyramidula is a genus of moss in the family Funariaceae.  It contains the single species Pyramidula tetragona distributed in central North America as well as Europe and Africa. Pyramid moss is a common name.

References

Funariales
Monotypic moss genera